Jankowice  is a village in the administrative district of Gmina Szydłowiec, within Szydłowiec County, Masovian Voivodeship, in east-central Poland.

The village has a population of 195.

References

Villages in Szydłowiec County